Scott Kellerman Foley  (born July 15, 1972) is an American actor and director. Foley is known for roles in television shows such as The Unit,  Scrubs,  Felicity, and Scandal, and in films such as Scream 3. He has also guest starred in series including Grey's Anatomy, Dawson's Creek, and House.

Early life
Foley was born in Kansas City, Kansas, the first of three boys of Constance and Hugh Foley. His father was an international banker, and the family lived in Japan and Australia during Foley's childhood. The family settled in St. Louis, Missouri when Scott was 15 years old. His mother died from ovarian cancer when he was 15 years old. Foley attended Ladue High School, before graduating from Clayton High School. His ancestry is Northern European: English, German, Irish and Scottish.

Career

Foley's breakthrough role was playing Noel Crane on Felicity. He had a recurring guest appearances on Scrubs as Elliot Reid's boyfriend, Sean Kelly, and on Dawson's Creek as Cliff.

In 2000, Foley appeared as Roman Bridger in Scream 3 (2000). He was nominated for a Teen Choice Award for his role.

Aside from acting, Foley directed one episode of Felicity (called "The Graduate") and three episodes of Scandal. In addition, he had a starring role as Sergeant First Class Bob Brown in the CBS military drama The Unit, during its four-season run, and directed one episode. He guest-starred as a drug-addicted baseball pitcher on House. He also produced the sitcom A.U.S.A., on which he appeared.

Foley appeared in three episodes of ABC's comedy Cougar Town. He signed on to play a businessman being shown houses by the show's resident real estate agent, Jules, played by Courteney Cox, reuniting with her nine years after Scream 3. Foley and Cox's characters began dating, but it ended quickly.

After appearing on Shonda Rhimes' Grey's Anatomy, Foley appeared as a guest star on the second season of her hit show Scandal as Captain Jake Ballard. Later that year he was added as a regular to the cast.

Foley portrayed the lead character in ABC's drama Whiskey Cavalier, which ran for one season starting on February 27, 2019, and guest starred in the ABC police drama The Rookie in 2020.

Directing
Foley made his feature film writing and directing debut in 2013 with Let's Kill Ward's Wife. Foley's wife, Marika Domińczyk, his sister-in-law Dagmara Domińczyk, and brother-in-law Patrick Wilson star in the film, along with Donald Faison, Amy Acker and Nicollette Sheridan.

Personal life
On October 19, 2000, Foley married actress Jennifer Garner, whom he met when she guest-starred on Felicity. Foley and Garner separated in March 2003 and Garner filed for divorce in May 2003.

Foley became engaged to Polish-born actress Marika Dominczyk in 2006, and in June 2007, the two wed in a private ceremony in Hawaii. They have three children: daughter Malina (b. November 2009) and sons Keller (b. April 2012) and Konrad (b. November 13, 2014).

Through the marriage, his sister-in-law is actress Dagmara Dominczyk, who is married to the actor Patrick Wilson.

In the seventh season's second episode of the genealogy reality program Who Do You Think You Are?, it was revealed that Foley had an ancestor, Samuel Wardwell, who was a defendant in the Salem witch trials. Another ancestor, Simon Wardwell, was a member of then General George Washington's "Life Guard" during the Revolutionary War.

Filmography

Film

Television

Music videos

Stage

References

External links

Scott Foley Bio at CBS - The Unit
Scott Foley interview

1972 births
20th-century American male actors
21st-century American male actors
American expatriates in Australia
American people of English descent
American people of German descent
American people of Irish descent
American people of Scottish descent
American male film actors
American male television actors
American expatriates in Japan
Living people
Male actors from Kansas City, Kansas